Synodontis tourei is a species of upside-down catfish endemic to Guinea where it is found in the Bafing River.  This species grows to a length of  TL.

References

External links 

tourei
Freshwater fish of West Africa
Endemic fauna of Guinea
Taxa named by Jacques Daget
Fish described in 1962